The Distinguished Service Cross (D.S.C.) is a military decoration for courage.  Different versions exist for different countries.

Distinguished Service Cross (Australia)
Distinguished Service Cross (United Kingdom)
Distinguished Service Cross (United States)